Carlo Mamo (born 23 April 1979 in Tarxien, Malta) is a retired professional footballer, who played as a defender.

Playing career

Tarxien Rainbows
Carlo began his career with his home town club, Tarxien Rainbows, in the 1997–98 season. Mamo went on to make 14 appearances and score one goal during the season. However, his first season ended in disappointment as Tarxien Rainbows finished in 10th position in the Maltese Premier League, requiring the club to be relegated to the First Division.

Mamo went into the 1998–99 season, hoping to help Tarxien Rainbows gain a quick return to the Maltese Premier League. However, the team failed to gain promotion, and remained in the Maltese First Division.

Birkirkara
Following a string of impressive performances for the Tarxien Rainbows, Carlo joined Birkirkara for the 1999–00 season. The move was an instant success as Mamo helped his new club finish in 1st position and win the Maltese Premier League title. Throughout the season, Carlo made 25 appearances, but failed to score a goal.

Sliema Wanderers
Despite the successes of the previous season, Carlo opted to leave the Birkirkara football club and join fellow Premier League side Sliema Wanderers for the 2000–01 season. In his first season with the Sliema Wanderers, Mamo made 19appearances and scored one goal, as he helped the club to a 2nd-place finish.

Carlo went into the 2001–02 season, as an established member of the first team squad. The club finished one position worse off than the previous, as they recorded a 3rd-place finish, with Carlo making 24 appearances, but failing to score a goal.

The 2002–03 season was one of triumph for Carlo, as he won his second Premier League title, and his first with the Sliema Wanderers, making 17 appearances and scoring one goal.

The success continued for Carlo and Sliema during the 2003–04 season. The club again finished in 1st position and won the title, with Mamo making 24 appearances without scoring.

Marsaxlokk
In 2004, Carlo Mamo swapped the  Wanderers for  fellow  Premier League team Marsaxlokk. His first season was the 2004-05 season. During his debut season with his new club, Carlo made 21 appearances, scoring two goals, and helped his club to a 5th-place finish.

In the 2005-06 season with Marsaxokk  Mamo made 24 appearances and score one goal. Marsaxokk improved to a 3rd-place finish.

Carlo Mamo and Marsaxlokk F.C. reached the heights of Maltese football during the 2006-07 season, as Mamo captained his team to the title for the first time in the club's history. Carlo proved instrumental in the club's success, forming a solid partnership in the centre of the defence with fellow Maltese International defender Luke Dimech. During the season Carlo made 25 appearances and scored two goals.

For the 2007-08 season, Carlo was hoping to help Marsaxlokk retain the  title. However, the club suffered the loss of many important players and finished in 2nd place in the League with Carlo making 19 appearances and scoring one goal.

Carlo went into the 2008-09 season captaining Marsaxlokk to a 4th-place finish, despite an extremely disappointing start to the season. Following a corruption case against the club, the club was relegated to the Maltese First Division. Carlo made 24 appearances, but failed to score.

Following the verdict of relegation for Marsaxlokk, Mamo showed loyalty by signing a new three and a half year contract with the club despite reported interest from Premier League duo Qormi and his home town club of Tarxien Rainbows. During the 2009-10 season, Mamo made a total of six appearances, but failed to score any goals.

Birkirkara
On 20 January 2010, the Marsaxlokk captain signed a deal to re-join his former club Birkirkara on loan until the end of the 2009-10 season. He made 11 appearances, helping Birkirkara to win the Maltese Premier League.

Tarxien Rainbows
On 4 January 2012, Carlo Mamo signed a deal of 18 months with the Tarxien Rainbows F.C.

Honours

Birkirkara
 Winner
 1999–00 Maltese Premier League
 2009–10 Maltese Premier League

Sliema Wanderers
 Winner
 2002–03, 2003–04 Maltese Premier League
 2004 Maltese Cup

Marsaxlokk
 Winner
 2006–07 Maltese Premier League

Career statistics
Statistics accurate as of match played 30 August 2010.

External links
 Carlo Mamo at MaltaFootball.com
 
 

1979 births
Living people
Maltese footballers
Tarxien Rainbows F.C. players
Birkirkara F.C. players
Sliema Wanderers F.C. players
Marsaxlokk F.C. players
Association football defenders
Malta under-21 international footballers
Malta international footballers